Lee Han-Saem  (born 18 October 1989) is a South Korean footballer who plays as a centre back for Gwangju FC in the K League 2.

External links 
 
 

1989 births
Living people
Association football defenders
South Korean footballers
Gwangju FC players
Gyeongnam FC players
Gangwon FC players
Suwon FC players
Asan Mugunghwa FC players
K League 1 players
K League 2 players
Konkuk University alumni